Burkina Faso competed at the 2015 African Games held in Brazzaville, Republic of the Congo.

Medal summary

Medal table

Athletics 

Burkina Faso won several medals in athletics.

Lætitia Bambara won the gold medal in the women's hammer throw event.

Marthe Koala won the bronze medal in the women's heptathlon and Pon-Karidjatou Traoré won one of the bronze medals in the women's 100 metres event.

Football 

Burkina Faso won the silver medal in the men's tournament.

Wrestling 

Two wrestlers represented Burkina Faso at the 2015 African Games. Blaise Debe won one of the bronze medals in the men's freestyle 74 kg event.

References 

Nations at the 2015 African Games
2015
African Games